Abdelhamid Hergal also spelled Harguel, Hargel or Herguel, born 27 January 1959 in Tunis, is a Tunisian footballer who played as a striker with team Stade Tunisien, Espérance Sportive de Tunis and Tunisia national football team. He is the top scorer in the league, in the history of Stade Tunisien with 85 goals. A true technician and dazzling goal scorer, he is considered the best right winger of all time to play for Tunisia.

References

External links
 Biography of Abdelhamid Hergal on baklawakhbar.wifeo.com

Tunisia international footballers
1959 births
Living people
Footballers from Tunis
Tunisian footballers
Stade Tunisien players
Sur SC players
Espérance Sportive de Tunis players
Tunisian Ligue Professionnelle 1 players
Oman Professional League players
Competitors at the 1979 Mediterranean Games
Competitors at the 1983 Mediterranean Games
Association football forwards
Mediterranean Games competitors for Tunisia